Dyspessa wagneri is a species of moth of the family Cossidae. It is found in the Near East (Turkey, Iran) and Ukraine.

References

Moths described in 1939
Dyspessa
Moths of Asia
Moths of Europe